The Mori–Torbole Tunnel (Italian: Galleria Adige–Garda) is a diversion tunnel completed in 1959 between the Italian towns of Mori and Nago-Torbole to connect the Adige river with Lake Garda.

Its function is to reduce water levels in the river upstream of the province of Verona by discharging excess water into the lake. The tunnel reduces the risk of flooding in Verona and environs from once every seventy years to once every two centuries.

When the tunnel is open, the temperature shock and inflow of mud caused by the sudden influx of the Adige's water endanger the lake's fish populations, although the lake's larger volume is able to absorb large quantities of extraneous water into itself. For these reasons the tunnel is used only on the rare occasion when there is a flood risk in the Veronese basin.

Main characteristics
 Length: 
 Share of lead:  a.s.l.
 Opening level:  a.s.l.
 Difference: 
 Slope: 0.8688%
 Average diameter: 
 Hydraulic section: 
 Maximum capacity: 
 Water speed at the maximum capacity: 
 Water speed at the minimum flow:

History
After the great floods of the second part of the 19th century (the last in 1882), defense of the city of Verona from Adige floods was deemed urgent. Using an idea already established in the 18th century, Venice's Water Magistrate proposed constructing a diversion tunnel to Lake Garda that would alleviate flooding by conveying that part of the Adige's flow exceeding the river's carrying capacity. The most appropriate solution was considered to be a tunnel originating on the right bank of the Adige near Ravazzone (a subdivision of Mori) and terminating at Lake Garda to the south of Torbole. The depth of the lake at that location would allow solid material that might be transported by the water to be deposited without damage. Construction began under the fascist government in March 1939, was suspended for the war in 1943, then resumed in 1954 to finish in May 1959.

Lake Loppio was drained during the construction of the tunnel. Water leaks became common as the tunnel approached the lake, and the lake was drained to prevent these and to reduce the danger posed to the workers.

The tunnel was used eleven distinct times in the 55 years between its opening and 2002. It was opened again in October 2018 in response to unusually high water levels in the Adige.

Features
The electromechanical equipment that supports the Adige-Garda Tunnel consists of grilles, watertight doors and gates with associated control panels, and controls housed in special rooms. The gates are positioned on four intake windows.

See also 
 Tunnel
 List of water tunnels

References 

Tunnels completed in 1959
Buildings and structures in Trentino
Tunnels in Italy
Canals opened in 1959
Drainage tunnels